is a 1943 black-and-white Japanese film directed by Hiroshi Shimizu and based on the true story of a 17-year-old Atayal girl called Sayun Hayun from Nan'ao village, Giran district, Taihoku Prefecture, Taiwan, who went missing and was thought to have drowned whilst helping carry the luggage of her teacher Masaki Takita during a storm in 1938.

Cast
 Shirley Yamaguchi as Sayon (credited as Ri Kôran)
 Toshiaki Konoe as Takeda
 Kenji Ôyama as Murai
 Kinuko Wakamizu as Murai's Wife
 Hatsu Shimazaki as Saburo
 Kenzô Nakagawa as Mona
 Hideko Mimura as Namina
 Hiroshi Mizuhara as Pig buyer, father of Sayon
 Minoru Nakamura as Taya

See also
Cinema of Taiwan
Taiwanese aborigines
Atayal people

References

External links
Internet Movie Database
Myth of the Images of Aborigines

Films directed by Hiroshi Shimizu
Atayal culture
Japanese drama films
Japanese black-and-white films
1943 drama films
1943 films